Victoria Camargo, known professionally as Victoria Wyndham (born May 22, 1945), is an American actress best known for her role as Rachel Cory on the soap opera Another World.

Personal life
Born Victoria Camargo, Wyndham is the daughter of Florence Skeels and Mexican-American stage and screen actor Ralph Camargo. Her sister is stage actress Felice Camargo. Wyndham's sons are actor Christian Camargo (né Christian Minnick) and photographer Darian Minnick.

Early career
Wyndham first started her acting career as understudy in the role of Hodel in the Broadway production of Fiddler on the Roof. She went on to perform cabaret with Lily Tomlin for two years at Upstairs at the Downstairs.

Daytime television credits

Wyndham first made a name for herself when she played Charlotte Waring Fletcher Bauer, (posing as Tracy Delmar) on the soap opera Guiding Light from 1967 to 1971. When she left The Guiding Light, she became a hot commodity in casting circles, with many soap operas offering contracts to her. She admitted in a TIME magazine interview that she almost did not follow through with a career in soap operas. Wyndham said, "When I first went into soaps, I didn't tell my serious acting friends. I thought they'd laugh. But now I'm proud of my work; some of the best acting, best moments are in this medium." She was subsequently cast on the soap opera Another World in the role of Rachel, for which she is perhaps best known. Wyndham succeeded actress Robin Strasser in the role and portrayed Rachel from 1972 until the show ended in 1999. Wyndham also was a writer.

When Wyndham took over the role from Strasser, the character was a villain. The head writer at the time, Harding Lemay, was impressed by Wyndham's range and decided to take the character in different directions. The character of Rachel was reformed after being paired with a much-older book publisher, Mackenzie Cory (Douglass Watson). It made Wyndham very popular with fans and proved to be very lucrative as well. Although highly regarded, Wyndham did have one peculiar run-in with a fan: author Annie Gilbert, in the book All My Afternoons, noted that Wyndham was mildly assaulted when an enraged fan, fed up with Rachel's scheming ways and thinking Wyndham was her character, attempted to punch her at a Lord & Taylor store in New York City, all the while screaming, "I hate you! I hate you!"

In the later years of the program, Wyndham took on the double role of Justine Duvalier, Rachel's new husband Carl's ex-lover. She played the dual role for two years (1995 and 1996) before Justine was killed off. Wyndham was honored with a special episode showcasing her noteworthy performances on Another World in July 1997.  At the time of the show's cancellation, she was the longest-running performer on the series.

Current work
Wyndham appeared in an episode of Law & Order: Special Victims Unit on January 2, 2007, as "Rita Colino," a former wife of the dead partner of Brian Dennehy's character.

Awards, honors and nominations

References

External links

 
 Victoria Wyndham at Internet Broadway Database
 December 2007 Wikinews interview with Victoria Wyndham

Actresses from Chicago
American soap opera actresses
American television actresses
1945 births
Living people
American actresses of Mexican descent
20th-century American actresses
21st-century American actresses